Michael Palaiologos or Michael Palaeologus may refer to:

Michael Palaiologos (general) (died 1156), Byzantine military leader
Michael VIII Palaiologos (1223–1282), Byzantine emperor
Michael IX Palaiologos (1277–1320), Byzantine emperor
Michael Palaiologos (son of Andronikos III) (born 1331), Byzantine prince
Michael Palaiologos (son of John V) (died 1376/7), Byzantine prince